Elektron ('electron'), in American sources sometimes called Electron, was the first Soviet multiple satellite program, comprising two identical pairs of particle physics satellites launched by the Soviet Union in 1964. Two of the four launched satellites are still in orbit as of 2020, the other two having reentered.

History

On 23 June 1960, Soviet spaceflight engineer Sergei Korolev's "big space plan" for the future of Soviet space endeavors was approved by the Central Committee of the Communist Party and the Council of Soviet Ministers. The plan included provisions for the development of scientific spacecraft to map Earth's Van Allen radiation belts.

Per decrees on 9 May 1960 and 13 May 1961, the satellites would consist of two identical pairs of spacecraft, the satellites of each pair in differing orbits to map the lower and upper Van Allen Belts simultaneously. The satellites would orbit at higher orbital inclinations than those launched by the United States (at an angle of 60 degrees vs. 30 degrees with respect to Earth's equator). Each pair would be deployed by a single Vostok rocket. Korolev's design bureau, OKB-1, began design work in July.  In addition to investigating Earth's natural radiation belts, they were designed to study artificial radiation belts created by high altitude nuclear tests. However, the ratification of the Partial Nuclear Test Ban Treaty in August 1963 ended such tests before the launch of the Elektron satellites.

Spacecraft design

Elektron 1 and 3

They were cylindrical with six solar panels with a combined area of 20 m2 for power generation.

The experiment packages for Elektron 1 and 3 were identical, each including a radio frequency mass spectrometer; Geiger counters, scintillation counters, and semiconductor detectors for radiation studies; a piezoelectric micrometeoroid detector; a galactic radio-noise receiver, and a radio beacon for ionospheric studies. Telemetry and commands were conveyed via four antennas. The internal environment of the satellites was kept moderated through thermal louvers.

Elektron 2 and 4

The satellites were to be boosted into highly eccentric  ×  orbits to map the outer Van Allen belt while, simultaneously, Elektron 1 and 3 probed the inner radiation belt. To achieve this orbit, Elektron 2 and 4 were each equipped with solid-propellant perigee kick motor of 3,350 kgf and 12 to 15 seconds duration.

The experiment packages for Elektron 2 and 4 were also identical, and each included a radio frequency mass spectrometer; Geiger counters, scintillation counters, and semiconductor detectors for radiation studies; a spherical ion trap; two three-axis fluxgate magnetometers; a galactic radio-noise receiver; solar X-ray photometers; and a Cerenkov-scintillator cosmic-ray telescope. Telemetry and commands were conveyed via four antennas. The internal environment of the satellites was kept moderated through thermal louvers, and the satellite stabilized with the aid of a sun sensor.

Missions

Mission 1

Elektrons 1 and 2 were launched on January 30, 1964, at 09:45:09 UTC from Launch Complex 1 at Baikonur Space Center (also known as NIIP-5) on a single Vostok 8K72K carrier rocket marking the first Soviet multiple satellite launch. The satellites, although launched from Earth together, were released at different stages, and so were able to achieve different orbits. The first satellite was released at a time when the upper stage of the launching rocket was still firing.

Elektron 1 returned usable data as late as October 1964; Elektron 2 as late as May 1964.

Mission 2

Elektron 3 and 4 were launched on July 11, 1964, at 21:51:02 UTC from Launch Complex 1 at Baikonur Space Center, again on a single Vostok 8K72K, with identical missions and similar orbits to that of Elektron 1 and 2.

Elektron 3 returned usable data as late as October 1964; Elektron 4 as late as November 1964.

Legacy and status

The Elektron satellites returned data that supported more than a dozen technical papers on a variety of subjects including near-Earth magnetic fields, particle distribution, and ionospheric studies, and allowed the assessment of risk to both cosmonauts and satellites from radiation in outer space. These satellites, along with the concurrent Kosmos satellite program, contributed to Soviet prestige, bolstering the impression that the Soviets, like the Americans, were committed to civilian as well as military application of satellites.

In July 1965, Elektron 1 and 2 were displayed among the new exhibits at Kosmos Pavilion in the Soviet exposition on achievements of U.S.S.R's national economy.

Elektron 4 decayed from its orbit on 12 October 1983, and Elektron 2 decayed from its orbit on 20 July 1997. Elektron 1 and 3 remain in orbit as of 25 April 2020.

See also

 Soviet space program

References

External links
 Current orbital information for Elektron 1. heavens-above.com
 Current orbital information for Elektron 3. heavens-above.com
 Detailed experiment descriptions for all Elektron satellites. Aviation Weekly and Space Report
Elektron-series satellites postal items
NASA Technical Reports related to Elektron

Satellites of the Soviet Union
Twin satellites
Satellite series
Geospace monitoring satellites